Narain Singh or Narain Singh Shahbazpuri was a politician from Punjab. He was an MLA representing the then Khalra assembly constituency as a member of the Indian National Congress. He was also a member of the now defunct Punjab Legislative Council between 1957 and 1962. He was assassinated by terrorists.

References

Year of birth missing
Year of death missing
Punjab, India MLAs 1962–1967
Members of the Punjab Legislative Council
Indian National Congress politicians from Punjab, India